The sapphire flycatcher (Ficedula sapphira) is a species of bird in the family Muscicapidae.
It is found in Bangladesh, Bhutan, China, India, Laos, Myanmar, Nepal, Thailand, and Vietnam.
Its natural habitat is subtropical or tropical moist montane forests.

Gallery

References

sapphire flycatcher
Birds of Eastern Himalaya
Birds of China
Birds of Yunnan
Birds of Myanmar
Birds of Laos
sapphire flycatcher
sapphire flycatcher
Taxonomy articles created by Polbot